Yeh Aman is a 1971 Pakistani film directed by Riaz Shahid, who also wrote the screenplay. The film is produced by his wife and actress Neelo. The film stars Nisho, Sangeeta, Adeeb, Jameel and Allauddin. The film revolves around the Kashmir liberation movement and also highlights the brutalities of Indian armed force on Kashmiris. The music was composed by A. Hameed with lyrics by Habib Jalib.

The film was censored, considering it as an anti-state film. Due to several cuts in the films, it failed to portray the director's vision, and was met with mixed critical reception. It was released 20 November 1971, days before Indo-Pakistani War of 1971, and could not perform well at the box office. After the film was censored, Shahid contracted cancer shortly after, and died next year of the film's release. Thus, it marked his last film.

Plot 
The film revolves around the brutalities of Indian armed forces on Kashmiris of Indian occupied Kashmir. The struggle and lives of Kashmiris who led miserable lives under the shadows of fear. The story starts from an innocent mute girl who is arrested by Indian armed forces who take her away with them and suspect her as an agent of Pakistan.

This film's core theme deals with the willingness of Kashmiris where they want to fight for their freedom.

Cast 
 Nisho
 Jameel
 Sangeeta
 Iqbal Hassan
 Adeeb
 Allauddin
 Agha Talish
 Saqi
 Shahid (guest appearance)

Soundtrack

Production 
The film was earlier titled simply as  Aman. However, it was chopped by the film censor authorities and released as Yeh Aman on 20 November 1971 with some changes.

Release and box office 
The film was released on 20 November 1971 and faced censorship due to its bold narrative about struggle in Kashmir. The film ended up being an average film at the box office.

In 1975, the then Prime Minister of Pakistan Zulfikar Ali Bhutto announced the first protest day on Feb 5 in support of the Kashmiris, and this film was shown on PTV Home in 1975.

Awards and nominations

References

External links 
 

1971 films
Pakistani drama films
1970s Urdu-language films
Films set in Kashmir
Kashmir conflict in films
Films set in Jammu and Kashmir
Films scored by A. Hameed
Nigar Award winners
Urdu-language Pakistani films